Foreign relations between Argentina and Switzerland, have existed for over a century. Diplomatic relations were established in 1834, with the opening of a Swiss consulate in Buenos Aires, followed in 1891 by the opening of an embassy.  Argentina has an embassy in Bern.

History
During the Nazi rule in Germany,  the small Swiss-Argentine community was reported to be strongly opposing the Nazis' penetration into Argentina.

After the defeat of Germany in World War II, Argentine officials posted in Switzerland (as well as in Sweden) became busy recruiting "useful Germans" (those with technical expertise needed by Argentina) for migration to this South American country.

Economic ties

Resident diplomatic missions 
 Argentina has an embassy in Bern.
 Switzerland has an embassy in Buenos Aires.

See also  
 Foreign relations of Argentina
 Foreign relations of Switzerland
 Swiss Argentines

References

External links 

  List of Treaties ruling relations Argentina and Switzerland (Argentine Foreign Ministry, in Spanish)
   Argentine embassy in Bern
 Swiss Federal Department of Foreign Affairs about relations with Argentina
  Swiss embassy in Buenos Aires

 
Switzerland
Bilateral relations of Switzerland